This is a list of Brazilian football transfers for the 2008 season. Only moves featuring at least one Série A or Série B club are listed.

The Brazilian transfer window is open all year round. The only deadline in Brazilian football is at the end of September when domestic transfers between Brazilian Clubs are halted until 31 December. Players within those clubs however are still free to move or arrive from abroad between September to December.

Players listed who have transferred to their new club for "Free" in Brazil do so under the guidelines of the Pelé Law. This is not to be confused with a similar and equivalent sister law in European Football known as the Bosman ruling.

Player transfers

KEY: F = Free ; L = Loan ; LR = Loan Return ; R=Released ; U = Undisclosed

References

External links
Globoesporte on globo.com
futebolpaulista
Santos club page on globo.com
gazetaesportiva
mercadofutebol
sports news on UOL.com

Transfers Summer 2008
Brazil
Brazil
2008